Sakshi is a 1967 Indian Telugu-language drama film written and directed by Bapu. The film stars Krishna, Vijaya Nirmala and Vijaya Lalitha, with Ramana Panthulu, Raja Babu, Chalapathi Rao, Allu Venkateswarlu, Jagga Rao and R. Ranga Rao in supporting roles. It is based on Mullapudi Venkata Ramana's 1959 story of the same name which itself was inspired by the 1952 American film High Noon. In Sakshi, a naïve and bucolic boatman is exploited by society and turns into a hard-hearted person.

Sakshi, the directorial debut of Bapu (who also worked as art director), was the first Telugu film to be shot completely in outdoor locations, with filming taking place in Pulidindi, a village located on the banks of the Godavari River. It was the acting debut of Ranga Rao, who later prefixed the film's title to his name. The entire film was completed in less than 20 days.

Sakshi was released on 1 July 1967. Although many people in the Telugu film industry believed the film would not run for even 20 days in theatres, it ran for almost a month and became a profitable venture, besides receiving critical acclaim. It was later screened at the Tashkent film festival in 1968, where it was also well received.

Plot 
Kishtaiah is a naïve and bucolic boatman living in Dachampaadu, an islet in the Godavari belt. In the same area lives Fakeeru, a dreaded criminal. The village head, known by his title Munasabu, hires Fakeeru as his lorry driver to transport coconuts to the town. The only person Fakeeru cares for in the village is his sister Chukka. He abandons Ratthi, a woman who was madly in love with him. Kishtaiah's uncle Gourayya and his fellow guard are murdered by Fakeeru when trying to stop him from stealing coconuts from Munasabus garden. As Kishtaiah is the sole witness to these murders, the village elders force him to testify against Fakeeru in court.

Fakeeru is arrested, but vows revenge. He escapes from prison, and no villager gives Kishtaiah shelter. Chukka marries Kishtaiah, in the hope that her brother would not kill him. Fakeeru is unaware of this and attacks Kishtaiah, who eventually abandons his naïve persona and kills Fakeeru. All the villagers who earlier shunned Kishtaiah now surround him, but Kishtaiah, disgusted with their selfish behaviour, leaves the village and surrenders to the police.

Cast 
 Krishna as Kishtaiah
 Vijaya Nirmala as Chukka
 Vijaya Lalitha as Ratthi
 Ramana Panthulu as Munasabu
 Raja Babu as Munasabus son
 Chalapathi Rao as Gourayya
 Allu Venkateswarlu as Gopi
 Jagga Rao as Fakeeru
 R. Ranga Rao as Karanam

Production

Development 
Sakshi was a story written by Mullapudi Venkata Ramana and published in the 28 October 1959 issue of Andhra Patrika, a weekly newspaper. The story was inspired by the American film High Noon (1952), retaining the plot element of a man sending a dreaded criminal to prison, and the criminal vowing revenge. For his directorial debut, Ramana's friend Bapu decided to adapt Sakshi. The film adaptation was produced by Suresh Kumar and Seshagiri Rao under Nandana Films. P. N. Selvaraj was chosen as the cinematographer at Bapu's suggestion. Bapu also worked as art director alongside Bhavaraju Seetharamudu, an engineer who helped the unit by laying new roads. Ramana wrote the film's dialogue, with most of it being in Rajahmundry dialect. Satyam handled the editing.

Casting and filming 
Krishna was cast as the male lead Kishtaiah. R. Ranga Rao was cast as Karanam in his acting debut, and later became known as Sakshi Ranga Rao. Krishna's future wife Vijaya Nirmala was cast as the female lead Chukka, and this was the first film where they acted together. Before the commencement of principal photography, Bapu took lessons on how to deal with close-up, mid-close-up and long shots from Kabir Das. Sakshi became the first Telugu film to be shot completely in outdoor locations. Pulidindi, a village located on the banks of the Godavari River, was chosen as the shooting location. According to Nirmala, after each day's shoot ended, Bapu "used to draw lines of his next day's shooting. He always drew his thoughts on paper so that everyone was comfortable when the shooting started." The scene depicting Kishtaiah and Chukka's marriage was shot at the Meesala Krishnudu temple of Pulidindi. The entire film was completed in less than 20 days.

Themes 
The Encyclopaedia of Indian Cinema calls Sakshi "a rare instance of late 60s New Indian Cinema aestheticism in Telugu". According to The Hindus Srivathsan Nadadhur, "The film not only lays importance on the crime angle, but also emphasises the need for humans to stand up for each other in times of crisis."

Soundtrack 
The soundtrack was composed by K. V. Mahadevan.

Release and reception 
Sakshi was released on 1 July 1967. It was publicised via posters with the tagline "20 rojullo teesina chitram" (the film which was shot in less than 20 days), and rival producer Aluri Chakrapani caustically commented, "20 rojullo teeste 20 rojule aaduddi" (the film will only run 20 days), a view shared by many others in the Telugu film industry. Despite this, the film received critical acclaim and ran for nearly a month, recovering its investment and making a marginal profit. It was later screened at the Tashkent film festival in 1968, where it was also well received.

References

Bibliography

External links 

1960s Telugu-language films
1967 directorial debut films
1967 drama films
1967 films
Films based on adaptations
Films directed by Bapu
Films scored by K. V. Mahadevan
Indian drama films